Jim Gannon (born 16 June 1977) is an Australian former professional rugby league footballer who played as a  in the 1990s, 2000s and 2010s.

Jim Gannon captained the New South Wales Under-18s to a series win. He was a Newcastle Knights junior playing Harold Matthews, SG Ball and reserve grade for the Newcastle Knights.
Gannon's first-grade career began at Balmain Tigers where he made 22 appearances as a substitute in 1998 and 1999.

Gannon arrived in the Super League at Halifax midway through the 1999 campaign. He made 87 Super League appearances at Halifax before making the short trip to the Huddersfield Giants in 2003. Gannon was a key member of the Huddersfield Giants pack for four seasons, making 93 appearances. He played for Huddersfield in the 2006 Challenge Cup Final as a prop forward against St. Helens but the Huddersfield Giants lost 12-42.

Gannon signed for the Hull Kingston Rovers in 2007 in preparation for the club's first season in the Super League. He made 24 appearances for the Hull Kingston Rovers helping them secure their Super League status for the 2008 season.

Gannon was released from the second year of his contract with Hull Kingston Rovers to join National League One club the Widnes Vikings for the 2008 season.

After spending 3 successful seasons with the Widnes Vikings, which included winning a Northern Rail Cup winners medal in 2009, Gannon re-joined his adopted home town club of Halifax for the 2011 season.

References

1977 births
Living people
Australian people of American descent
Australian expatriate sportspeople in England
Australian rugby league players
Balmain Tigers players
Halifax R.L.F.C. players
Huddersfield Giants players
Hull Kingston Rovers players
Rugby league players from Newcastle, New South Wales
Rugby league props
Widnes Vikings players